In the Ottoman Empire of the 17th century the yerliyya were local Janissaries who had been sent to an urban centre many years earlier and had become fully integrated into their surroundings, often playing important roles in the commercial and political life of the area.

The other sub-group of Janissaries were known as the kapıkulu; these were Janissaries that had been sent on direct order from the Ottoman Sultan. In general, the kapıkulu were far more loyal to the Porte than the yerliyya. In many areas of the empire conflict developed between these two groups of Janissaries, which persisted until the Janissaries were abolished in 1826.

References

Janissaries